Travelling the Face of the Globe is the fourth studio album released by London, England based band Oi Va Voi. The first single of the album is Every Time.

Track listing

Personnel
Nik Ammar - guitar, charango, strumstick, kazoo, percussion
Bridgette Amofah - vocals
Josh Breslaw - drums, percussion
Steve Levi - clarinet, vocals
Dave Orchant - trumpet
Anna Phoebe - violin
Lucy Shaw - double bass, electric bass

External links
 The Guardian review
 The Independent review
   Oi Va Voi's Official MySpace Page

Oi Va Voi albums
2009 albums
Experimental music albums